Mehrabad-e Shor Shor (also Romanized as Mehrābād-e Shor Shor; also known as Mehrābād and Mehrābādā) is a village in Kenevist Rural District, in the Central District of Mashhad County, Razavi Khorasan Province, Iran. At the 2006 census, its population was 88, in 20 families.

References 

Populated places in Mashhad County